Phyllodromus is a genus of mites in the Phytoseiidae family.

Species
The genus Phyllodromus contains the following species:
 Phyllodromus leiodis De Leon, 1959
 Phyllodromus trisetatus Moraes & Melo, 1997

References

Phytoseiidae